Upper Meeting House of the Baptist Church of Middletown (also known as Holmdel Community Church of the United Church of Christ) is a historic church at 40 Main Street in Holmdel Township, Monmouth County, New Jersey, United States. It was the first Baptist church congregation in New Jersey.

The Holmdel Community Church congregation was formed as a result of a twentieth century merger between the Middletown Baptist Church and the Dutch Reformed Congregation. The Baptist congregation was founded in 1688 by Baptists from Rhode Island and was known as Upper Meeting and it shared a minister with Lower Meeting, the other Baptist congregation in the area, which is now known as Old First Church in Middletown. The first church building on the current site of Holmdel Community Church was constructed by the Baptists in 1705. The current church building was constructed in 1809 (with later additions) and was added to the National Register of Historic Places in 1990.  The Dutch Reformed congregation was originally located nearby and was founded in 1699. It was previously known as the Middletown Church of the Navesink, and later as the Dutch Reformed Church of Freehold and Middletown.

References

External links
Official website

Churches completed in 1809
19th-century Baptist churches in the United States
Churches in Monmouth County, New Jersey
Gothic Revival church buildings in New Jersey
Holmdel Township, New Jersey
Churches on the National Register of Historic Places in New Jersey
United Church of Christ churches in New Jersey
Baptist churches in New Jersey
National Register of Historic Places in Monmouth County, New Jersey
New Jersey Register of Historic Places